= Maeyken Blomme =

Maeyken Blomme (fl. ca. 1611 CE) was a Dutch person who, dressed in men's clothing, attempted to accompany their lover to sea.

Blomme's lover Jan van Hondthorst, was a sergeant originally from Delft. He was to set sail on the ship Der Vere, bound for Batavia. In order to go with van Hondthorst, Blomme put on men's clothing and snuck onto the ship. However, before the ship left port, Blomme's disguise was discovered, and they were removed from the ship.

Blomme was placed in prison in Middleburg, and, after her family refused to pay any of the associated prison costs, these costs were deducted from van Hondthorst's salary. Some sources say Blomme was imprisoned because, after being removed from the ship, they had 'gone mad' due to being separated from van Hondthorst.
